At the Eurovision Song Contest 1999, Israel was represented by Israeli band Eden with the song "Yom Huledet (Happy Birthday)".

The Israeli entry for the 1999 contest in Jerusalem was announced on 17 January 1999, having been selected internally by an expert committee assembled by the country's public broadcasting service IBA.

Israel was drawn to compete ninetieth in the contest, held on 29 May 1999. At the end of the night, the nation placed 5th in the field of 23 entries, receiving 93 points.

Before Eurovision

Internal selection 
900 songs were submitted by the public, which were subsequently evaluated by a special committee that shortlisted four songs. On 17 January 1999, IBA announced that Eden were selected as the Israeli representatives for the Eurovision Song Contest 1999 with the song "Yom Huledet".

At Eurovision
Israel performed 19th on the night of the contest, following Austria and preceding Malta. At the close of voting it had received 93 points and finished in 5th place.

Voting

References

1999
Countries in the Eurovision Song Contest 1999
Eurovision